PSB Bogor (stands for Persatuan Sepakbola Bogor) is an Indonesian football club based in  Bogor. They currently compete in the Liga 3. Their home stadium is Pajajaran Stadium.

History
PSB Bogor was established in 1950, they became known in the 90s. At that time, they managed to come out as runners-up 1990–91 Soeratin Cup. The following season, they again managed to qualify for the Soeratin Cup final. This time, they were against a team as strong as PSIM Yogyakarta. learning from previous failures, they managed to come out as champions after winning with a score of 2-0. This is also the first prestigious title in the history of the club.

And for the second time, they came back as winners of the Soeratin Cup in the 1992–93 season in the West Java zone. They successfully beat Persikasi Bekasi with a score of 1-0. This victory brought them to represent West Java to play at the national level. As a result, they successfully won the Soeratin Cup at the national level.

These consecutive wins continue to be recorded by them. In the 1993–94 Suratin Cup competition season, they came back as champions after defeating Persebaya Surabaya at the Gelora 10 November Stadium with a score of 5-4 (via penalty).

However, in the 1994–95 season, they only came out as runners up in the Soeratin Cup. at that time they were defeated by rival club Persikasi Bekasi. However, in the following year. They won the Soeratin Cup again after beating Persis Solo. This victory also made PSB a team with five titles in the history of the Soeratin Cup.

Former players
  Bako Sadissou
 Ellie Aiboy
 Imran Nahumarury
 Tugiyo

Squad
Goal keeper:
 Rafli Agustian
 Teguh Maulana Insan
 Candra Amin Azinta
Defender:
 Deni Setiawan
 Sopi Fahmi
 Misfahulfalah
 Asep Purnama Bahri
 Dodi Kuswara
 Deni Imam
 Ahmad Sopian
 Heri Andriawan
 Dani Hermawan
Midfielder:
 Ahmad S
 Asep Ramdani
 Rizki Lesmana
 Victor Ilhami
 I Komang Adyana
 Rony Surya
 Deby Darmawan
 Nizar Azhari Septian
 Dicky Janwar
 Buharuddin
 Yusuf Rendy Raharjo
Striker:
 Anwar Hidayat
 Irvan Firdaus
 Iqbal Nugraha
 Rondi Alfera

References

External links

 
Football clubs in Indonesia
Football clubs in West Java
Association football clubs established in 1950
1950 establishments in Indonesia